Antonovka is a rural locality (a selo) in Beloozersky Selsoviet, Gafuriysky District, Bashkortostan, Russia. The population was 592 as of 2010. There are 9 streets.

Geography 
Antonovka is located 21 km northwest of Krasnousolsky (the district's administrative centre) by road. Dmitriyevka is the nearest rural locality.

References 

Rural localities in Gafuriysky District